The 2020 Indonesian census was the 7th census in Indonesia. It was held in September 2020 by Statistics Indonesia. The resident Indonesia population was projected to be 269.6 million, a 13.4% increase from the 2010 census.

Introduction 
As required by the Indonesian Constitution and recommendation of United Nations, Indonesian census has been conducted since 1961, and from 1980, the census has been held every 10 years, when the year ends in "0". The 2020 census was the 7th census in Indonesia.

Technology
It is planned that the 7th census will be carried out using digital equipment, no longer relying on paper. Head of BPS, Kecuk Suhariyanto said that the digital equipment in question included smartphone and web applications. The hope is that the equipment will help field enumerators who collect data, also make it easier for citizens who want to enter their own data.

In addition to smartphone applications, it is also developing web applications. The difference is, this application is intended directly to residents, so they can fill their own data without going through a field enumerator.

Projection
The Statistics Indonesia in 2018 has released the official projection of Indonesia's population 2015–2045, which are based on previous census in 2010 and the 2015 Indonesian population survey between censuses (SUPAS). The projection was calculated using component method and also take into consideration births, deaths, and net migration.

In 2020, the population of Indonesia is projected to be 269,603,400 and the dependency ratio will be reach on 45.40, the lowest dependency ratio in Indonesian history.

Result

Total population
On 21 January 2021, Statistics Indonesia released the result of the 2020 census. It found the total population of Indonesia to be 270,203,917 people, compared to the population in the year 2010 of 237,641,326 people. This is an increase of 32,562,591 people (13.70% in 10 years or an average of 1.25% per year).

Sex ratio
As the result of 2020 census, there are 136,661,899 males and 133,542,018 females in Indonesia. It found the sex ratio for Indonesia is 102.34, which means that for every 100 females, there are 102-103 males. The largest sex ratio is in Papua with 114 males for every 100 females, and the smallest sex ratio is in Yogyakarta, with 98 males for every 100 females.

Age Structure
0–14 years     =  23.33% 

15–64 years    =  70.72%

65+ years       =  5.95%

Population distribution

Impact of COVID-19 

Indonesia prepared to extend the online time for self-enumeration, and cancel all field data collection. They relied on administrative data and had requested additional UNFPA technical support for using administrative data for census.

References

Population census, 2020
Population census
Government of Indonesia
2020 censuses